Simons's spiny rat (Proechimys simonsi) is a spiny rat species found in Bolivia, Brazil, Colombia, Ecuador and Peru. It was named for American scientific collector Perry O. Simons.

Phylogeny
Morphological characters and mitochondrial (cytochrome b) DNA sequences showed that P. simonsi represents one independent evolutionary lineage within the genus Proechimys, without clear phylogenetic affinity for any of the six major groups of species.

References

Proechimys
Mammals of Colombia
Fauna of the Amazon
Mammals described in 1900
Taxa named by Oldfield Thomas